Bernsdorf is a municipality in the district of Zwickau in Saxony in Germany. Bernsdorf is part of the Municipal association Rund um den Auersberg. The population as of 2007 was 2,505.

Notable people 

 Max Ernst Opitz (1890-1982), 1949-1951 Lord Mayor of Leipzig
 Gerhard Thieme (born 1928), sculptor
 Volker Bigl (1942-2005), physician and brain researcher, 
 Gottfried Klimbt (born 1943), athlete

References 

Zwickau (district)